The Two Ridings Community Foundation (TRCF) is an English charity and community foundation which over the past ten years has made grants totaling over £5 million to more than 1,700 local projects in York, North Yorkshire, the East Riding of Yorkshire and Hull, and raised more than £2 million which is invested in a long term endowment fund.

Two Ridings is one of 54 Community Foundations in the UK.

Mission 

It aims to increase private philanthropy and build on its permanent endowment fund to make grants to charities and community groups in the area.

History 

The Two Ridings Community Foundation was established in October 2000  as the York and North Yorkshire Community Foundation (YNYCF). In 2010 the Foundation changed its name to the Two Ridings Community Foundation when it extended its area of work to include the East Ridings of Yorkshire and Hull.

Grant making 

Funds are raised from private donations, businesses, philanthropists, trusts and statutory bodies. Funds are distributed to local charities and community projects in York, North Yorkshire, the East Riding of Yorkshire and Hull, supporting projects to benefit:

 Children and young people
 People with special needs and other disabilities
 Older people
 Disadvantaged people
 Artistic and cultural life

UK Community Foundations
Charities based in North Yorkshire